Ces Quesada (born June 13, 1958) is a Filipino actress and TV host. She is currently signed with GMA Network and ABS-CBN.

Filmography

Television

Film

References

1958 births
Living people
Filipino film actresses
ABS-CBN personalities
GMA Network personalities
Filipino television actresses